Issa Mohamed (born 1 March 1995) is a Kenyan swimmer. He competed in the men's 50 metre butterfly event at the 2017 World Aquatics Championships. In 2019, he represented Kenya at the 2019 African Games held in Rabat, Morocco.

References

External links
 

1995 births
Living people
Kenyan male swimmers
Place of birth missing (living people)
Commonwealth Games competitors for Kenya
Swimmers at the 2018 Commonwealth Games
African Games competitors for Kenya
Swimmers at the 2019 African Games
Male butterfly swimmers